James Wilder (born August 5, 1968) is an American film and television actor.

Wilder was born in Cleveland, Ohio, and raised in Sausalito, California.

The son of a French mother and an Italian father, Wilder performed as a fire eating street performer before he became an actor.

Wilder portrayed Adam Louder on the Fox soap opera Models Inc., Christopher Searls on the ABC TV drama Equal Justice and Nick Lewis on the 1993 remake of Route 66 on NBC.

Personal life 

In 1997, Wilder dated actress Kirstie Alley. The two met on the set of Nevada and soon were engaged, but split after 4 years.

Filmography 
 1987 Cracked Up (TV Movie)
 1987 Zombie High
 1988 Murder One
 1988 State Park
 1988 Midnight Magic (TV Movie)
 1990 Equal Justice (26 episodes)
 1991 Scorchers
 1992 Prey of the Chameleon
 1993 Route 66 (TV series)
 1993 Night Owl (TV Movie)
 1994 Melrose Place (7 episodes)
 1994 Confessions: Two Faces of Evil (TV Movie)
 1994-1995 Models Inc. (20 episodes)
 1994 Tonya and Nancy: The Inside Story (TV Movie)
 1996 A Face to Die For (TV Movie)
 1996 To Love, Honor and Deceive (TV Movie)
 1997 Our Mother's Murder (TV Movie)
 1997 Allie & Me
 1997 Nevada
 1998 Charades
 1998 Veronica's Closet (3 episodes)
 1998 Ivory Tower
 2000 Closing the Deal
 2001 Burning Down the House
 2001 Touched by a Killer
 2001 Heart of Stone
 2002 Face Value
 2002 Man of the Year
 2003 Mind Games
 2006 The Perfect Marriage (TV Movie)
 2009 The Funk Parlor
 2015 3 Holes and a Smoking Gun

References

External links 
 

1968 births
20th-century American male actors
Living people
Male actors from Cleveland
21st-century American male actors
American male film actors
American male television actors
American people of French descent